Sturisomatichthys aureum, also known by several common names, including whiptail (English), Gylden Størmalle (Danish), Helikoptermal (Swedish), and Stoerwels (German), is a species of armored catfish endemic to Colombia. The species can be found in the aquarium trade. Its specific name, aureus, refers to its coloration, which can appear golden.

Distribution 
Sturisomatichthys aureum occurs in the Magdalena, San Jorge and Cesar River basins, along with their tributaries. It is believed to be replaced downstream by another Sturisoma species.

References

Harttiini
Endemic fauna of Colombia
Freshwater fish of Colombia
Fish of the Andes
Magdalena River
Taxa named by Franz Steindachner
Fish described in 1900